The 1964 Jutland Series (Danish: Jyllandsserien 1964) was the 66th edition of the Danish fifth-tier association football division since its establishment in 1902. Governed by the Jutland Football Association (JBU), the season was launched on 30 March 1964, and the last round of regular league matches concluded on 8 November 1964, with the league championship final being played on 15 November 1964. Silkeborg IF, Vorup Frederiksberg BK, Brande IF and Holstebro BK entered as relegated teams from last season's fourth-tier, while Hobro IK, Vejen SF, Viborg FF (reserves) and Aabyhøj IF Thrott entered as promoted teams from the 1963 JBUs Serie 1. Fixtures for the 1964 season were announced on 13 March 1964, 2½ weeks prior the season's start. The league featured reserve teams for higher ranking league clubs, whose players could indiscriminately be used on both the league and reserve teams, after a quarantine period of one match day.

The reserve team of Aarhus GF won the league final, securing their eleventh Jutlandic League Championship title, while IK Aalborg Freja and Silkeborg IF were promoted to the fourth-tier, returning to the nation-wide leagues of the Danmarksturneringen after 27 and one year(s) respectively. At the end of the season, the three clubs with the fewest points in the final league standings, Struer IF, AIA (reserves) and Aabyhøj IF Thrott, were relegated to the 1965 JBUs Serie 1. Centerforward Herluf Bang of Silkeborg IF was the league's top scorer, netting 28 goals, corresponding to 43.75 percent of his own team's goals.

Summary
The 1964 season was inaugurated on 30 March, on the 2nd day of Easter, following the announcement of the season's fixtures on 13 March 1964 by the Jutland FA. The first match day saw the postponement of two league matches due to the condition of the field caused by the weather. In the northern group, Vorup Frederiksberg BK opened the season with four victories, having goalkeeper Niels Hougård and the defense not concede any goals until their fifth match against the Aalborg BK's reserve team. Vorup Frederiksberg BK lost their second league match and the top spot in the league standings on 10 May, when they clashed against IK Aalborg Freja. Hobro IK held the top position shortly, but lost it the following match day. IK Freja officially overtook the first place on 20 May, when the Aalborg-based club won an evening game against local rivals IK Chang Aalborg – due to better head-to-head points against Vorup Frederiksberg BK and with one of their league games having been postponed. The club finished the spring season as the only undefeated team in the Jutland Series.

IK Aalborg Freja played a local derby against the reserve team of Aalborg BK in front of 2,000 spectators at their home ground at Vesterkæret (aka Frejaparken), winning the game 2 to 1. The first match day of the fall season experienced the biggest home win of 9–0 take place between Vejle BK (II) versus Aabyhøj IF Thrott on 8 August 1964 at Vejle Stadium, with five goals being scored by forward Helge Jensen.

The majority of players on JBU's selected regional league squad (JBUs udvalgte serieunionshold) played in the Jyllandsserien, while the remaining players came from fourth-tier JBU teams. They were for instance selected to the match against the Zealand FA (SBU) on 7 May 1964.

IK Aalborg Freja had a 19 match-long undefeated run, and their only loss of the league season occurred after they secured the northern league group title on 11 October 1964 against IK Chang Aalborg, while their closest competitor in the group, Vorup Frederiksberg BK, suffering a defeat away against Skive IK. A total of nineteen players was used in the line-ups for the league matches, with the majority of the players being 22–23 years old. The players, that was part of the line-up in the decisive game, that secured the club the promotion spot on ? against ?, featured goalkeeper Jørgen "Nønne" Bach, defenders Mogens Madsen and Per "Nigger" Nielsen, midfielders Ole "Sjulle" Schultz, Erik "Koppi" Juul Christensen and Freddie "Lange Freddy" Jensen, forwards John "Dion" Meyer, Per "Lille-Per" Larsen, Christian Frederiksen, Jens Ole "Sømand" Nielsen and Leif "Lazy" Larsen. Additionally, the following players took part in one or more games throughout the season, Reidar Gundersen, Jørgen Lund Petersen, Laurits Krogh, Ole Olsen, Børge Hasselgren, Hans Jørgen Nielsen, Per Hjørringgård and Jørgen Abildgård. The senior team was coached by Arne Holt, a former footballer with over 400 caps on IK Aalborg Freja's best squad, who resigned after the conclusion of the season. IK Aalborg Freja returned to the Danmarksturneringen i fodbold's league system for the first time since the 1936–37 season.

With the reserve team of Aarhus GF not being eligible for promotion, second-placed Silkeborg IF was the second team to gain promotion to the fourth-tier, returning after just a one-year absence. Silkeborg IF was placed higher than Vejen SF in the classification due to higher head-to-head points, despite Vejen SF having a better goal average. As winners of their respective groups, Aarhus GF and IK Aalborg Freja qualified for the league championship play-offs. Struer IF and Aabyhøj IF Thrott finished last in both their respective league groups and were relegated to the 1965 JBUs Serie 1. The tournament rules stipulated that a total of four should be relegated to the regional second-tier. Due to only one Jutland FA member club being relegated from the 1964 Kvalifikationsturneringen, the total number of relegations were reduced to three. As Holstebro BK had more points than IF Thrott Fodbold as the other second bottom team, they were reprieved from relegation for numerical reasons. Vejgaard BK was placed ahead of Holstebro BK in the classification due to head-to-head points.

Teams
Twenty-four teams competed in the league, split into two groups with each twelve teams – sixteen teams from the previous season, four teams relegated from the fourth tier and four teams promoted from the four groups of the regional second-tier. The promoted teams were Hobro IK, Aabyhøj IF Thrott and the reserve team of Viborg FF, who were all playing in the regional top-flight league for the first time, while Vejen SF returned after a one-year absence. They replaced Lindholm IF, Skagen IK, Frederikshavn fI (reserves), Viby IF, IK Skovbakken (reserves) and Ikast FS (reserves), ending their regional top flight spells of two, one, twelve, seventeen, one and six year(s) respectively. The relegated teams were Silkeborg IF, who was experiencing their second consecutive relegation, while Vorup Frederiksberg BK, Brande IF and Holstebro BK, were returning to the sixth tier after a two, one and one season(s) respectively in the Jyllandsserien.

Stadia and locations

Personnel

Coaching changes

League tables
Every team played two games against the other teams, at home and away, totaling 22 games each. Teams received two points for a win and one point for a draw. If two or more teams were tied on points, places were determined by goal average. The team with the most points were crowned winners of the league group, and qualified for the championship play-offs. The highest placed eligible non-reserve teams in each group were promoted to the 1965 Kvalifikationsturneringen. As a starting point, the two teams in each group with the fewest points would be relegated to the 1965 JBUs Serie 1, but the number of relegations would decrease or increase depending on the number of JBU member teams relegated from the 1964 Kvalifikationsturneringen.

Nordkredsen table

Sydkredsen table

Results

Nordkredsen results

Sydkredsen results

Statistics

Scoring

Top scorers

Hat-tricks

Clean sheets

Discipline

Player
 Most warnings: 1
  Heine Hald (Aalborg BK reserves) on 19 April 1964 against Hjørring IF
  William Fahlberg (Vorup Frederiksberg BK) on 25 April 1964 against Aalborg BK reserves
  Erik Hyldahl (Vorup Frederiksberg BK) on 25 April 1964 against Aalborg BK reserves
  Henning Christensen (Holstebro BK) on 26 April 1964 against IK Chang Aalborg reserves
  Bent Nissen (IK Chang Aalborg reserves) on 26 April 1964 against Holstebro BK
  Knud Erik Jensen (Esbjerg KFUM) of 2 May 1964 against BK Herning Fremad
 Most evictions: 1
  Bjarne Knudsen (IK Chang Aalborg reserves) on 26 April 1964 against Holstebro BK
  Jørgen Hansen (Vejen SF) on 3 May 1964 against Haderslev FK
  Allan Voigt (Vorup Frederiksberg BK) on 24 May 1964 against Struer IF

Club
 Most warnings: 2
 Vorup Frederiksberg BK
 Most evictions: 1
 IK Chang Aalborg (reserves), Vejen SF and Vorup Frederiksberg BK

Championship play-offs

Summary
The final for the Jutlandic Series League Championship was contested at Hobro Stadium between the winners of the northern and southern groups, IK Aalborg Freja and the reserve team of Aarhus GF. An agreement on the location and date/time of the final could not be reached among the clubs themselves, so on 11 November the Jutland FA determined that the match would be played at a neutral ground in Hobro on 15 November 1964 – at the exact same time that the final top-flight league match of the season involving Aarhus GF's first senior team. The line-up of Aarhus GF consisted of seven footballers, that had previously played on the club's senior team in the top-flight league, while Leif Olsen, Per Simonsen, Søren Knoth and Christian Kryger were relatively young players. Full back and Erik Christensen was the only player on Aarhus GF's team to have played in every single match of the season. Left winger Christian Kryger had previously played on Odense BK's first senior team. Jørgen Abildgaard replaced Per left full back Per Nielsen, but otherwise the line-up of IK Aalborg Freja for the final was the same as in the previous league matches.

Twenty minutes into the match, Aarhus GF's center forward Verner Hermansen received a hard kick to the leg after a collision with the opponent's Jørgen Abildgård, making him to leave the field for a few minutes to recover before entering the game again, but shortly thereafter he was forced to leave the game completely and watch the rest of the final from the spectator stands. Playmaker Kjeld Jensen moved in as the new center forward. While the Aarhus GF players had the best start to the match, they did not manage to get past IK Aalborg Freja's defense and goalkeeper Jørgen Bach. At the end of the first half, the IK Aalborg Freja players had several scoring opportunities against Aarhus GF's remaining ten players on the field. On one occasion, when battling for the ball in front of Aarhus GF's goal line in the 35th minute of play, the Aarhus GF player Leif Olsen was attempting to kick the ball, resulting in the ball rolling towards the goal with the full back Arne Jensen trying to clear the ball, but instead accidentally hit his teammate, winger Viggo Holm, and the ball went into the goal.

At the very start of the second half, a heavy downpour set in, making the field very greasy and hampered the game for the rest of the match. After eight minutes of play in the second half, Aarhus GF tied the match. The referee awarded a controversial penalty kick, following a foul for use of hands committed by right half back Ole Schultz, which was executed by Aarhus GF's left inner winger Søren Knoth. Three minutes later, the Aarhus-based team secured their victory in the match, when right winger Kjeld Jensen got clear of the defense and managed to net the decisive ball close to one of the goal posts outside the reach of goalkeeper Jørgen Bach.

The Jutlandic Football League Championship was the 11th title won by Aarhus GF of which nine had been won by the first team up to and including the 1935–36 season and the two subsequent titles by the reserve team. At the award ceremony right after the conclusion of the match, the Jutland FA representative C. M. Nielsen handed Aarhus GF's captain Erik Christensen a gift of remembrance and pins with an emblem to each of the players, before asking the opponents to rise and say hurrah for the winners.

Details

References

Jutland Football Championship seasons
1963–64 in European fifth tier association football leagues
1964–65 in European fifth tier association football leagues
1963–64 in Danish football
1964–65 in Danish football